is a Japanese football player.

Playing career
Tsubasa Nihei played for J2 League club; Mito HollyHock from 2013 to 2014.

Club statistics
Updated to 20 February 2017.

References

External links

1994 births
Living people
Association football people from Chiba Prefecture
Japanese footballers
J2 League players
J3 League players
Mito HollyHock players
J.League U-22 Selection players
Vonds Ichihara players
Association football midfielders